State Route 211 (SR 211) is a  S-shaped state highway in the northeastern part of the U.S. state of Georgia. Its routing is within portions of Barrow, Gwinnett, and, Hall counties.

Route description
SR 211 begins at an intersection with US 29/SR 8/SR 316 (University Parkway) in Statham, in Barrow County. It heads north-northeast to an intersection with SR 82. It curves to the west to meet SR 11 (Jefferson Highway), northeast of Winder. The two highways run concurrent into Winder. Just after entering town, SR 53 (Gainesville Highway) joins the concurrency. A few blocks later, the three routes intersect SR 82 (E. Broad Street). In the main part of town, SR 211 leaves to the northwest, while SR 11/SR 53 continue to the southwest on N. Broad Street, and travels through rural areas until it reaches SR 124, southwest of Braselton. Just after SR 211 is an interchange with Interstate 85 (I-85). A short distance later, the route cuts across the northernmost corner of Gwinnett County and intersects SR 347 (Thompson Mill Road NE). It enters Hall County and heads northwest and curves to the north until it meets SR 53 (Winder Highway) again. It has a second brief concurrency with it. The road heads northeast until it reaches its northern terminus, an intersection with SR 60/SR 322 (Candler Road), southeast of Gainesville.

Major intersections

See also

References

External links

 Georgia Roads (Routes 201 - 220)

211
Transportation in Barrow County, Georgia
Transportation in Gwinnett County, Georgia
Transportation in Hall County, Georgia